An election was held on November 8, 2016, to elect all 120 members to North Carolina's House of Representatives. The election coincided with elections for other offices, including U.S. President, U.S. Senate, U.S. House of Representatives, state governor and state senate. The primary election was held on March 15, 2016.

There was no change in the composition of the House (compared to the results of the 2014 elections) as Republicans retained their three-fifths supermajority, winning 74 seats compared to 46 seats for the Democrats.

Results Summary

Statewide

Incumbents defeated in general election

Democrats
Brad Salmon (D-District 51), defeated by John Sauls (R)
Joe Sam Queen (D-District 119), defeated by Mike Clampitt (R)

Republicans
Marilyn Avila (R-District 40), defeated by Joe John (D)
Gary Pendleton (R-District 49), defeated by Cynthia Ball (D)
Rob Bryan (R-District 88), defeated by Mary Belk (D)

Open seats that changed parties
Paul Tine (I-District 6) didn't seek re-election, seat won by Beverly Boswell (R)
Ken Waddell (D-District 46) didn't seek re-election, seat won by Brenden Jones (R)
Justin Moore (R-District 92) didn't seek re-election, seat won by Chaz Beasley (D)

Detailed Results

District 1
Incumbent Republican Bob Steinburg has represented the 1st District since 2013.

District 2
Incumbent Republican Larry Yarborough has represented the 2nd district since 2015.

District 3
Incumbent Republican Michael Speciale has represented the 3rd district since 2013.

District 4
Incumbent Republican Jimmy Dixon has represented the 4th district since 2011.

District 5
Incumbent Democrat Howard Hunter III has represented the 5th district since 2015.

District 6
Incumbent independent politician Paul Tine has represented the 6th district since 2013. Tine didn't seek re-election. Republican Beverly Boswell won the open seat.

District 7
Incumbent Democrat Bobbie Richardson has represented the 7th district since 2013.

District 8
Incumbent Republican Susan Martin has represented the 8th district since 2013.

District 9
Incumbent Republican Greg Murphy has represented the 9th district since 2015.

District 10
Incumbent Republican Majority Leader John Bell has represented the 10th district since 2013.

District 11
Incumbent Democrat Duane Hall has represented the 11th district since 2013.

District 12
Incumbent Democrat George Graham has represented the 12th district since 2013.

District 13
Incumbent Republican Pat McElraft has represented the 13th district since 2007.

District 14
Incumbent Republican George Cleveland has represented the 14th district since 2005.

District 15
Incumbent Republican Phil Shepard has represented the 15th district since 2011.

District 16
Incumbent Republican Chris Millis has represented the 16th district since 2013.

District 17
Incumbent Republican Frank Iler has represented the 17th district since 2009.

District 18
Incumbent Democrat Susi Hamilton has represented the 18th district since 2011.

District 19
Incumbent Republican Ted Davis Jr. has represented the 19th district since 2012.

District 20
Incumbent Republican Holly Grange has represented the 20th district since 2016. Grange was elected to her first full term.

District 21
Incumbent Democrat Larry Bell has represented the 21st district and its predecessors since 2001.

District 22
Incumbent Democrat William Brisson has represented the 22nd district since 2007.

District 23
Incumbent Democrat Shelly Willingham has represented the 23rd district since 2015.

District 24
Incumbent Democrat Jean Farmer-Butterfield has represented the 24th district since 2003.

District 25
Incumbent Republican Jeff Collins has represented the 25th district since 2011. His opponent James D. Gailliard sought election to this seat again in 2018 and became Collin's successor when he left office.

District 26
Incumbent Republican Leo Daughtry has represented the 26th district and its predecessors since 1993. Daughtry didn't seek re-election and Donna McDowell White won the open seat.

District 27
Incumbent Democrat Michael Wray has represented the 27th district since 2005.

District 28
Incumbent Republican James Langdon Jr. has represented the 28th district since 2005. Republican Larry C. Strickland won the open seat.

District 29
Incumbent Democratic Minority Leader Larry Hall has represented the 29th district since 2006.

District 30
Incumbent Democrat Paul Luebke has represented the 30th district since 1991. Luebke died before the election, but was re-elected posthumously. Philip Lehman was appointed to succeed Luebke at the start of 2017-2018 session.

District 31
Incumbent Democrat Mickey Michaux has represented the 31st district and its predecessors since 1983.

District 32
Incumbent Democrat Nathan Baskerville has represented the 32nd district since 2013. Baskerville didn't seek re-election and Democrat Terry Garrison won the open seat.

District 33
Incumbent Democrat Rosa Gill has represented the 33rd district since 2009.

District 34
Incumbent Democrat Grier Martin has represented the 34th district since 2013.

District 35
Incumbent Democrat Chris Malone has represented the 35th district since 2013.

District 36
Incumbent Republican Nelson Dollar has represented the 36th district since 2005.

District 37
Incumbent Republican Paul Stam has represented the 37th district since 2003. Stam didn't seek re-election. Republican Linda Hunt Williams won the open seat.

District 38
Incumbent Democrat Yvonne Lewis Holley has represented the 38th district since 2013.

District 39
Incumbent Democrat Darren Jackson has represented the 39th district since 2009.

District 40
Incumbent Republican Marilyn Avila has represented the 40th district since 2007. She lost re-election to Democrat Joe John.

District 41
Incumbent Democrat Gale Adcock has represented the 41st district since 2015.

District 42
Incumbent Democrat Marvin Lucas has represented the 42nd district since 2001.

District 43
Incumbent Democrat Elmer Floyd has represented the 43rd district since 2009.

District 44
Incumbent Democrat William "Billy" Richardson has represented the 44th district since 2015.

District 45
Incumbent Republican John Szoka has represented the 45th district since 2013.

District 46
Incumbent Democrat Ken Waddell has represented the 46th district since 2013. Waddell didn't seek re-election and was succeeded by Republican Brenden Jones.

District 47
Incumbent Democrat Charles Graham has represented the 47th district since 2011.

District 48
Incumbent Democrat Garland Pierce has represented the 48th district since 2005.

District 49
Incumbent Republican Gary Pendleton has represented the 49th district since 2014.  He was defeated for re-election by Democrat Cynthia Ball.

District 50
Incumbent Democrat Graig Meyer has represented the 50th district since 2013.

District 51
Incumbent Democrat Brad Salmon has represented the 51st district since 2015. Salmon lost re-election to Republican John Sauls

District 52
Incumbent Republican Jamie Boles has represented the 52nd district since 2009.

District 53
Incumbent Republican David Lewis has represented the 53rd district since 2003.

District 54
Incumbent Democrat Robert Reives II has represented the 54th district since 2014.

District 55
Incumbent Republican Mark Brody has represented the 55th district since 2013.

District 56
Incumbent Democrat Verla Insko has represented the 56th district since 1997.

District 57
Incumbent Democrat Pricey Harrison has represented the 57th district since 2005.

District 58
Incumbent Democrat Chris Sgro has represented the 58th district since his appointment in 2016. Sgro didn't seek re-election and fellow Democrat Amos Quick won the open seat.

District 59
Incumbent Republican Jon Hardister has represented the 59th district since 2013.

District 60
Incumbent Democrat Cecil Brockman has represented the 60th district since 2015.

District 61
Incumbent Republican John Faircloth has represented the 61st District since 2011.

District 62
Incumbent Republican John Blust has represented the 62nd District since 2001.

District 63
Incumbent Republican Stephen Ross has represented the 63rd District since 2013.

District 64
Incumbent Republican Dennis Riddell has represented the 64th District since 2013.

District 65
Incumbent Republican Bert Jones has represented the 65th District since 2011.

District 66
Incumbent Democrat Ken Goodman has represented the 66th District since 2011.

District 67
Incumbent Republican Justin Burr has represented the 67th District since 2009.

District 68
Incumbent Republican Craig Horn has represented the 68th District since 2011.

District 69
Incumbent Republican Dean Arp has represented the 69th District since 2013.

District 70
Incumbent Republican Pat Hurley has represented the 70th District since 2007.

District 71
Incumbent Democrat Evelyn Terry has represented the 71st District since 2013.

District 72
Incumbent Democrat Ed Hanes has represented the 72nd District since 2013.

District 73
Incumbent Republican Lee Zachary has represented the 73rd District since 2015.

District 74
Incumbent Republican Debra Conrad has represented the 74th District since 2013.

District 75
Incumbent Republican Donny Lambeth has represented the 75th District since 2013.

District 76
Incumbent Republican Carl Ford has represented the 76th District since 2013.

District 77 
Incumbent Republican Harry Warren has represented the 77th District since 2011.

District 78
Incumbent Republican Allen McNeill has represented the 78th District since 2012.

District 79
Incumbent Republican Julia Craven Howard has represented the 79th District and its predecessors since 1989.

District 80
Incumbent Republican Sam Watford has represented the 80th District since 2015.

District 81
Incumbent Republican Rayne Brown has represented the 81st District since 2011. Brown didn't seek re-election and Republican Larry Potts won the open seat.

District 82
Incumbent Republican Larry Pittman has represented the 82nd District since 2011.

District 83
Incumbent Republican Linda Johnson has represented the 83rd District and its predecessors since 2001.

District 84
Incumbent Republican Rena Turner has represented the 84th District since 2013.

District 85
Incumbent Republican Josh Dobson has represented the 85th District since 2013.

District 86
Incumbent Republican Hugh Blackwell has represented the 86th District since 2009.

District 87
Incumbent Republican George Robinson has represented the 87th District since 2015. Robinson ran for re-election but was defeated by Republican Destin Hall in the Republican Primary. Hall easily won the general election.

District 88
Incumbent Republican Rob Bryan has represented the 88th District since 2013. Bryan lost re-election to Democrat Mary Belk.

District 89
Incumbent Republican Mitchell Setzer has represented the 89th District and its predecessors since 1999.

District 90
Incumbent Republican Sarah Stevens  has represented the 90th District since 2009.

District 91
Incumbent Republican Kyle Hall has represented the 91st District since 2015.

District 92
Incumbent Republican Justin Moore has represented the 92nd District since August 2016 after Charles Jeter resigned. Democrat Chaz Beasley defeated Republican Beth Danae Caulfield in the general election.

District 93
Incumbent Republican Jonathan Jordan has represented the 93rd District since 2011.

District 94
Incumbent Republican Jeffrey Elmore has represented the 94th District since 2013.

District 95
Incumbent Republican John Fraley has represented the 95th District since 2015.

District 96
Incumbent Republican Jay Adams has represented the 96th District since 2015.

District 97
Incumbent Republican Jason Saine has represented the 97th District since 2011.

District 98
Incumbent Republican John Bradford has represented the 98th District since 2015.

District 99
Incumbent DemocratRodney Moore has represented the 99th District since 2011.

District 100
Incumbent Democrat Tricia Cotham has represented the 100th District since 2007. Cotham didn't seek re-election and Democrat John Autry won the open seat.

District 101
Incumbent Democrat Beverly Earle has represented the 101st District and its predecessors since 1995.

District 102
Incumbent Democrat Becky Carney has represented the 102nd District since 2003.

District 103
Incumbent Republican Bill Brawley has represented the 103rd District since 2011.

District 104
Incumbent Republican Dan Bishop has represented the 104th District since 2015. Bishop didn't seek re-election and successfully was elected to Senate district 39. Republican Andy Dulin won the open seat.

District 105
Incumbent Republican Scott Stone has represented the 105th District since May 2016. Stone was elected to his first full term.

District 106
Incumbent Democrat Carla Cunningham has represented the 106th District since 2013.

District 107
Incumbent Democrat Kelly Alexander has represented the 107th District since 2009.

District 108
Incumbent Republican John Torbett has represented the 108th District since 2011.

District 109
Incumbent Republican Dana Bumgardner has represented the 109th District since 2013.

District 110
Incumbent Republican Kelly Hastings has represented the 110th District since 2011.

District 111
Incumbent Republican Speaker of the House Tim Moore has represented the 111th District since 2003.

District 112
Incumbent Republican David Rogers has represented the 112th District since  August 2016. Rogers was elected to his first full term.

District 113
Incumbent Republican Chris Whitmire has represented the 113th District since 2013. Whitmire didn't seek re-election. Republican Cody Henson won the open seat.

District 114
Incumbent Democrat Susan Fisher has represented the 114th District since 2004.

District 115
Incumbent Democrat John Ager has represented the 115th District since 2015.

District 116
Incumbent Democrat Brian Turner has represented the 116th District since 2015.

District 117
Incumbent Republican Chuck McGrady has represented the 117th District since 2011.

District 118
Incumbent Republican Michele Presnell has represented the 118th District since 2013.

District 119
Incumbent Democrat Joe Sam Queen has represented the 119th District since 2013. Queen was defeated for re-election by Republican Mike Clampitt.

District 120
Incumbent Republican Roger West has represented the 120th District and its predecessors since 2000.  West didn't seek re-election and Republican Kevin Corbin won the open seat.

Notes

References

North Carolina House of Representatives
House of Representatives
2016